The Asian Football Confederation's Pre-Olympic Tournament was held from 7 February to 21 November 2007.  Twenty-four teams entered the qualification for the three allocated spots for the 2008 Summer Olympics Football tournament in Beijing.

The qualification saw Australia, Korea Republic, and Japan winning their final round groups and qualifying to the Olympics.

Format 
Asian berths for the final is 3 plus the host China PR (automatically qualified).

Preliminary round
14 highest seeded teams received byes for the second round. Other 20 teams were paired, where each pair played home and away. The 10 winners would advance to the second round.
Second round
24 teams were grouped into 6 groups of 4 teams each, where each group would consist of home and away round-robin tournament. The winners and runners-up of each group would advance to the final stage.
Final round
12 teams were grouped into 3 groups of 4 teams each, where each group would consist of home and away round-robin tournament. The winners of each group would qualify to the finals.

Preliminary round 1

The first legs were played on 7 February and the second legs on 14 February 2007. The aggregate winners advanced to the second round.

1 The first leg of the Vietnam–Afghanistan match in Hanoi was cancelled due to the Afghanistan team's financial problems that led to the team being unable to afford to travel to Vietnam, and security worries. FIFA rescheduled the single-tie match to 14 February 2007.

2 Withdrew

Preliminary round 2

Matches were played from 28 February to 6 June 2007. The top two teams in each group advancing to the final round.

Preliminary round 3

The final round was played in three groups of four teams each held from 22 August to 21 November 2007. The winner of each group will represent Asia at the 2008 Olympic Games with host China. The groups were drawn on 13 June.

See also
Football at the 2008 Summer Olympics
Football at the 2008 Summer Olympics – Women's qualification#AFC (Asia)

External links
 Official site of the AFC Olympic Qualifiers

Football qualification for the 2008 Summer Olympics
Football at the Summer Olympics – Men's Asian Qualifiers